Bagan (formerly Pagan) is an ancient city and a UNESCO World Heritage Site in the Mandalay Region of Myanmar. From the 9th to 13th centuries, the city was the capital of the Bagan Kingdom, the first kingdom that unified the regions that would later constitute Myanmar. During the kingdom's height between the 11th and 13th centuries, more than 10,000 Buddhist temples, pagodas and monasteries were constructed in the Bagan plains alone, of which the remains of over 2200 temples and pagodas survive.

The Bagan Archaeological Zone is a main attraction for the country's nascent tourism industry.

Etymology
Bagan is the present-day standard Burmese pronunciation of the Burmese word Pugan, derived from Old Burmese Pukam. Its classical Pali name is Arimaddanapura (lit. "the City that Tramples on Enemies"). Its other names in Pali are in reference to its extreme dry zone climate: Tattadesa ("parched land"), and Tampadīpa ("bronzed country"). The Burmese chronicles also report other classical names of Thiri Pyissaya and Tampawaddy.

History

9th to 13th centuries

According to the Burmese chronicles, Bagan was founded in the second century AD, and fortified in 849 AD by King Pyinbya, 34th successor of the founder of early Bagan. Mainstream scholarship however holds that Bagan was founded in the mid-to-late 9th century by the Mranma (Burmans), who had recently entered the Irrawaddy valley from the Nanzhao Kingdom. It was among several competing Pyu city-states until the late 10th century when the Burman settlement grew in authority and grandeur.

From 1044 to 1287, Bagan was the capital as well as the political, economic and cultural nerve center of the Bagan Empire. The prosperous city grew in size and grandeur, and became a cosmopolitan center for religious and secular studies, specializing in Pali scholarship in grammar and philosophical-psychological (abhidhamma) studies as well as works in a variety of languages on prosody, phonology, grammar, astrology, alchemy, medicine, and legal studies. The city attracted monks and students from as far as India, Sri Lanka and the Khmer Empire.

The culture of Bagan was dominated by religion. The religion of Bagan was fluid, syncretic and by later standards, unorthodox. It was largely a continuation of religious trends in the Pyu era where Theravada Buddhism co-existed with Mahayana Buddhism, Tantric Buddhism, various Hindu (Saivite, and Vaishana) schools as well as native animist (nat) traditions. While the royal patronage of Theravada Buddhism since the mid-11th century had enabled the Buddhist school to gradually gain primacy, other traditions continued to thrive throughout the Pagan period to degrees later unseen.

The Pagan Empire collapsed in 1287 due to repeated Mongol invasions (1277–1301). Recent research shows that Mongol armies may not have reached Bagan itself, and that even if they did, the damage they inflicted was probably minimal. However, the damage had already been done. The city, once home to some 50,000 to 200,000 people, had been reduced to a small town, never to regain its preeminence. The city formally ceased to be the capital of Burma in December 1297 when the Myinsaing Kingdom became the new power in Upper Burma.

14th to 19th centuries

Bagan survived into the 15th century as a human settlement, and as a pilgrimage destination throughout the imperial period. A smaller number of "new and impressive" religious monuments still went up to the mid-15th century but afterward, new temple constructions slowed to a trickle with fewer than 200 temples built between the 15th and 20th centuries. The old capital remained a pilgrimage destination but pilgrimage was focused only on "a score or so" most prominent temples out of the thousands such as the Ananda, the Shwezigon, the Sulamani, the Htilominlo, the Dhammayazika, and a few other temples along an ancient road. The rest—thousands of less famous, out-of-the-way temples—fell into disrepair, and most did not survive the test of time.

For the few dozen temples that were regularly patronized, the continued patronage meant regular upkeep as well as architectural additions donated by the devotees. Many temples were repainted with new frescoes on top of their original Pagan era ones, or fitted with new Buddha statutes. Then came a series of state-sponsored "systematic" renovations in the Konbaung period (1752–1885), which by and large were not true to the original designs—some finished with "a rude plastered surface, scratched without taste, art or result". The interiors of some temples were also whitewashed, such as the Thatbyinnyu and the Ananda. Many painted inscriptions and even murals were added in this period.

20th century to present

Bagan, located in an active earthquake zone, had suffered from many earthquakes over the ages, with over 400 recorded earthquakes between 1904 and 1975. A major earthquake occurred on 8 July 1975, reaching 8 MM in Bagan and Myinkaba, and 7 MM in Nyaung-U. The quake damaged many temples, in many cases, such as the Bupaya, severely and irreparably. Today, 2229 temples and pagodas remain.

Many of these damaged pagodas underwent restorations in the 1990s by the military government, which sought to make Bagan an international tourist destination. However, the restoration efforts instead drew widespread condemnation from art historians and preservationists worldwide. Critics are aghast that the restorations paid little attention to original architectural styles, and used modern materials, and that the government has also established a golf course, a paved highway, and built a  watchtower. Although the government believed that the ancient capital's hundreds of (unrestored) temples and large corpus of stone inscriptions were more than sufficient to win the designation of UNESCO World Heritage Site, the city was not so designated until 2019, allegedly mainly on account of the restorations.

Bagan today is a main tourist destination in the country's nascent tourism industry, which has long been the target of various boycott campaigns. Several Burmese publications note that the city's small tourism infrastructure will have to expand rapidly even to meet a modest pickup in tourism in the following years.

On 24 August 2016, a major earthquake hit central Myanmar and again did major damage in Bagan; this time almost 400 temples were destroyed. The Sulamani and Myauk Guni (North Guni) were severely damaged. The Bagan Archaeological Department has started a survey and reconstruction effort with the help of UNESCO experts. Visitors are prohibited from entering 33 damaged temples.

On 6 July 2019, Bagan was officially inscribed as a World Heritage Site by UNESCO, after 24 years since the military government first nominated the city in 1995, during the 43rd session of the World Heritage Committee. This makes Bagan the second World Heritage Site in Myanmar, after the Ancient Cities of Pyu. As part of the criteria for the inscription of Bagan, the government of Myanmar has pledged to relocate existing hotels in the archaeological zone to a dedicated hotel zone by 2020.

Geography
The Bagan Archaeological Zone, defined as the  area centred around Old Bagan, consisting of Nyaung U in the north and New Bagan in the south, lies in the vast expanse of plains in Upper Burma on the bend of the Irrawaddy river.

Climate
Bagan lies in the middle of the "dry zone" of Burma, the region roughly between Shwebo in the north and Pyay in the south. Unlike the coastal regions of the country, which receive annual monsoon rainfalls exceeding , the dry zone gets little precipitation as it is sheltered from the rain by the Rakhine Yoma mountain range in the west.

Available online climate sources report Bagan climate quite differently.

Cityscape

Architecture
Bagan stands out for not only the sheer number of religious edifices of Myanmar but also the magnificent architecture of the buildings, and their contribution to Burmese temple design. The artistry of the architecture of pagodas in Bagan proves the achievement of Myanmar craftsmen in handicrafts. The Bagan temple falls into one of two broad categories: the stupa-style solid temple and the gu-style (ဂူ) hollow temple.

Stupas
A stupa, also called a pagoda or chedi, is a massive structure, typically with a relic chamber inside. The Bagan stupas or pagodas evolved from earlier Pyu designs, which in turn were based on the stupa designs of the Andhra region, particularly Amaravati and Nagarjunakonda in present-day south-eastern India, and to a smaller extent to Ceylon. The Bagan-era stupas in turn were the prototypes for later Burmese stupas in terms of symbolism, form and design, building techniques and even materials.

Originally, a Ceylonese stupa had a hemispheric body ( "the egg"), on which a rectangular box surrounded by a stone balustrade (harmika) was set. Extending up from the top of the stupa was a shaft supporting several ceremonial umbrellas. The stupa is a representation of the Buddhist cosmos: its shape symbolizes Mount Meru while the umbrella mounted on the brickwork represents the world's axis. The brickwork pediment was often covered in stucco and decorated in relief. Pairs or series of ogres as guardian figures ('bilu') were a favourite theme in the Bagan period.

The original Indic design was gradually modified first by the Pyu, and then by Burmans at Bagan where the stupa gradually developed a longer, cylindrical form. The earliest Bagan stupas such as the Bupaya (c. 9th century) were the direct descendants of the Pyu style at Sri Ksetra. By the 11th century, the stupa had developed into a more bell-shaped form in which the parasols morphed into a series of increasingly smaller rings placed on one top of the other, rising to a point. On top the rings, the new design replaced the harmika with a lotus bud. The lotus bud design then evolved into the "banana bud", which forms the extended apex of most Burmese pagodas. Three or four rectangular terraces served as the base for a pagoda, often with a gallery of terra-cotta tiles depicting Buddhist jataka stories. The Shwezigon Pagoda and the Shwesandaw Pagoda are the earliest examples of this type. Examples of the trend toward a more bell-shaped design gradually gained primacy as seen in the Dhammayazika Pagoda (late 12th century) and the Mingalazedi Pagoda (late 13th century).

Hollow temples

In contrast to the stupas, the hollow gu-style temple is a structure used for meditation, devotional worship of the Buddha and other Buddhist rituals. The gu temples come in two basic styles: "one-face" design and "four-face" design—essentially one main entrance and four main entrances. Other styles such as five-face and hybrids also exist. The one-face style grew out of 2nd century Beikthano, and the four-face out of 7th century Sri Ksetra. The temples, whose main features were the pointed arches and the vaulted chamber, became larger and grander in the Bagan period.

Innovations
Although the Burmese temple designs evolved from Indic, Pyu (and possibly Mon) styles, the techniques of vaulting seem to have developed in Bagan itself. The earliest vaulted temples in Bagan date to the 11th century, while the vaulting did not become widespread in India until the late 12th century. The masonry of the buildings shows "an astonishing degree of perfection", where many of the immense structures survived the 1975 earthquake more or less intact. (Unfortunately, the vaulting techniques of the Bagan era were lost in the later periods. Only much smaller gu style temples were built after Bagan. In the 18th century, for example, King Bodawpaya attempted to build the Mingun Pagoda, in the form of spacious vaulted chambered temple but failed as craftsmen and masons of the later era had lost the knowledge of vaulting and keystone arching to reproduce the spacious interior space of the Bagan hollow temples.)

Another architectural innovation originated in Bagan is the Buddhist temple with a pentagonal floor plan. This design grew out of hybrid (between one-face and four-face designs) designs. The idea was to include the veneration of the Maitreya Buddha, the future and fifth Buddha of this era, in addition to the four who had already appeared. The Dhammayazika and the Ngamyethna Pagoda are examples of the pentagonal design.

Notable cultural sites

Museums

The Bagan Archaeological Museum: The only museum in the Bagan Archaeological Zone, itself a field museum a millennium old. The three-story museum houses a number of rare Bagan period objects including the original Myazedi inscriptions, the Rosetta stone of Burma.
Anawrahta's Palace: It was rebuilt in 2003 based on the extant foundations at the old palace site. But the palace above the foundation is completely conjectural.

3D Documentation with LiDAR 
The Zamani Project from the University of Cape Town, South Africa, offered its services towards the spatial documentation of monuments in Bagan in response to the destruction of monuments by an earthquake in August 2016. After reconnaissance visit to Bagan and a subsequent meeting at the UNESCO offices in Bangkok in February 2017, the Zamani Project documented 12 monuments in Bagan using LiDAR, during three field campaigns between 2017 and 2018, including Kubyauk-gyi (Gubyaukgyi) (298); Kyauk-ku-umin (154); Tha-peik-hmauk-gu-hpaya (744); Sula-mani-gu-hpaya (Sulamani) (748) Monument 1053; Sein-nyet-ama (1085); Sein-nyet-nyima (1086); Naga-yon-hpaya (1192); Loka-ok-shaung (1467); Than-daw-kya (1592); Ananda Monastery; and the City Gate of old Bagan (Tharabha Gate).

Transport
Bagan is accessible by air, rail, bus, car and river boat.

Air
Most international tourists fly to the city. The Nyaung U Airport is the gateway to the Bagan region. Several domestic airlines have regular flights to Yangon, which take about 80 minutes to cover the 600 kilometres. Flights to Mandalay take approximately 30 minutes and to Heho about 40 minutes. The airport is located on the outskirts of Nyaung U and it takes about 20 minutes by taxi to reach Bagan.

Rail
The city is on a spur from the Yangon-Mandalay rail line. Myanmar Railways operates a daily overnight train service each way between Yangon and Bagan (Train Nos 61 & 62), which takes at least 18 hours. The trains have a sleeper car and also 1st Class and Ordinary Class seating.
Between Mandalay and Bagan there are two daily services each way (Train Nos 117,118,119 & 120) that take at least 8 hours. The trains have 1st Class and Ordinary Class seating.

Buses and cars
Overnight buses and cars also operate to and from Yangon and Mandalay taking approximately 9 and 6 hours respectively.

Boat
An 'express' ferry service runs between Bagan and Mandalay. Following the Irrawaddy river the fastest ferry takes around 9 hours to travel the 170 kilometres. The service runs daily during peak periods and slower sailings with overnight stops are also available.

Economy

Bagan's economy is based mainly on tourism. Because of boycotts against the previous military government, the Bagan region's tourism infrastructure is still quite modest by international standards. The city has a few international standard hotels and many family-run guesthouses. Bagan is also the center of Burmese lacquerware industry, which to a large degree depends on tourist demand. Much of the lacquerware is destined for souvenir shops in Yangon, and to the world markets. Moreover, the lacquerware-making process itself has become a tourist draw.

Demographics
The population of Bagan in its heyday is estimated anywhere between 50,000 to 200,000 people. Until the advent of tourism industry in the 1990s, only a few villagers lived in Old Bagan. The rise of tourism has attracted a sizable population to the area. Because Old Bagan is now off limits to permanent dwellings, much of the population reside in either New Bagan, south of Old Bagan, or Nyaung-U, north of Old Bagan. The majority of native residents are Bamar.

Administration
The Bagan archaeological zone is part of Nyaung-U District, Mandalay Region.

Sister cities
 Luang Prabang, Laos
 Siem Reap, Cambodia

Gallery

See also 

Buddhism in Myanmar
Burmese pagoda
Pagoda festival 
Index of Buddhism-related articles
List of Pagodas in Bagan

Notes

References

Rao, Vinay Kumar. “Buddhist Art of Pagan, 2 Vols.” Published by Agam Kala Publications, New Delhi, 2011. .

External links

Bagan Map. DPS Online Maps.
Bagan Travel Guide
All about Bagan (english version)
Free travel images of Bagan
The Life of the Buddha in 80 Scenes, Ananda Temple Charles Duroiselle, Archaeological Survey of India, Annual Report, Delhi, 1913–14
The Art and Culture of Burma - the Pagan Period Dr. Richard M. Cooler, Northern Illinois University
Asian Historical Architecture: Bagan Prof. Robert D. Fiala, Concordia University, Nebraska
Buddhist Architecture at Bagan Bob Hudson, University of Sydney, Australia
Photographs of temples and paintings of Bagan Part 1 and Part 2
Bagan moving postcards

 
Township capitals of Myanmar
9th-century establishments in Asia
Populated places established in the 9th century
Pagan Kingdom
Buddhist temples in Myanmar
Populated places in Mandalay Region
Buddhist pilgrimage sites in Myanmar
Buddhist art
Tourist attractions in Myanmar
World Heritage Sites in Myanmar